Pope Peter III may refer to:

Peter III of Alexandria (fl. 477–490 AD), 27th Pope of Alexandria & Patriarch of the See of St. Mark
Peter III of Palmar de Troya (Joseph Odermatt), 4th Pope of the Palmarian Catholic Church

See also
Peter III (disambiguation)